Kamy may refer to:
 KAMY (FM), a Lubbock, Texas radio station broadcasting on 90.1 FM
 Kami, a divine being in Shinto culture

People 
 Kamy Sepehrnoori, a Bank of America centennial professor
 Kamy Keshmiri, an American athlete